Brendan Gerald Lane (born November 19, 1990) is an American retired professional basketball player who last played for Alvark Tokyo of the B.League in Japan.

References

External links
Pepperdine Waves Bio
Eurobasket.com Profile

1990 births
Living people
Alvark Tokyo players
American expatriate basketball people in Germany
American expatriate basketball people in Japan
American men's basketball players
Basketball players from California
Basketball players from Vermont
Centers (basketball)
Nagoya Diamond Dolphins players
People from Montpelier, Vermont
People from Rocklin, California
Pepperdine Waves men's basketball players
s.Oliver Würzburg players
Shimane Susanoo Magic players
Sportspeople from Greater Sacramento
UCLA Bruins men's basketball players